Mary Catherine Seymour Howell (August 29, 1844 – February 18, 1913) was a leader, lecturer, and activist for women's suffrage in the United States. She authored the bill granting women the right to vote in New York State that passed in 1892. She was a very magnetic orator, her addresses enlivened with anecdotes, and through them all ran a vein of sentiment.  Her speeches were received with enthusiasm, and the press spoke of her in terms of highest praise.

Early years and education
Mary Seymour Howell was born in Mount Morris, New York, August 29, 1844. She was the only daughter of Norman and Frances Metcalf Seymour, who were prominent members of the local community. She was a lineal descendant of the Seymour family, well known in English history through the Puritan representative, Richard Seymour, who settled in Hartford, Connecticut, in 1639.

She received a classical education, attending local schools in Mt. Morris before graduating from the Genesee Wesleyan Seminary in Lima, New York.

Career
She devoted much time to the higher education of New York State and did much work for the cause of temperance. In 1883, she became interested in securing suffrage for women. Howell is best known for her oratory abilities. Under the care of lecture bureaus, she delivered many historical and literary lectures, addressing audiences in many of the cities and villages of the North and West, as well as in New England and her own State.

She repeatedly plead the cause of women before committees of State legislatures and of Congress. Howell was the first woman who ever asked to speak before the Connecticut House of Representatives. In 1890, she delivered the address to the graduating class of South Dakota College. In the 1890s, she spoke in Kansas and the Dakotas with her colleague, the national suffrage advocate Susan B. Anthony, who was from Rochester, New York. She was appointed in 1891, by Elizabeth Cady Stanton, the president of the National American Woman Suffrage Association, to represent that body in the National Council of Women of the United States in Washington, D.C. Howell and Anthony made a tour of New York State in 1894, presenting the state constitutional convention with a "monster suffrage petition." She was also a national lecturer for the Women's Christian Temperance Union (W.C.T.U.).

Personal life
In 1869, she was married to George Rogers Howell from Long Island. He was employed at the New York State Library, serving as the State Librarian for a time, and died in 1889 at Albany, where they resided. Howell's only child, Seymour Howell, died a junior in Harvard University, March 9, 1891.

She died on February 18, 1913, at her hometown of Mt. Morris and is buried at the Mt. Morris Cemetery.

Apparition
The American Society for Psychical Research (1913) published this "ACCOUNT OF AN APPARITION WHICH APPEARED TO MARY SEYMOUR HOWELL IN 1871":—

References

Citations

Attribution

Bibliography

External links
 

American suffragists
1844 births
1913 deaths
People from Mount Morris, New York
Genesee Wesleyan Seminary alumni
Wikipedia articles incorporating text from A Woman of the Century